The Hyundai Elantra N TCR is a racing car developed by Hyundai Motorsport. It is Hyundai's third TCR car after the Hyundai i30 N TCR and the Hyundai Veloster N TCR.

Development
The Elantra N TCR was unveiled by Hyundai Motorsport in September 2020, before which it took part in an intensive test program for 3 months and with the help of Gabriele Tarquini, among others, ran . both longer competition packages were developed in parallel. Spy photos of the events were also leaked.

The car is equipped with a front-wheel drive and 2-liter turbocharged engine in accordance with the TCR rules, which comes from the base engine of the then completely new Hyundai Elantra. It has the same six-speed transmission with shift paddles as the previous two Hyundai TCR models. It was officially unveiled at Auto China. Hyundai Motorsport said the project started with a completely blank sheet of paper, allowing designers and engineers in the Customer Racing department to take full advantage of Elantra's stable, high-performance chassis and limousine body to optimize design - its predecessors were sloping. To create the best competitive package, they were able to leverage the experience of more than two years of racing customers of the i30 N TCR and Veloster N TCR, while taking advantage of opportunities to upgrade their existing car wherever possible.

The car made its competitive debut at the 2021 Michelin Pilot Challenge season opener at the Daytona International Speedway. Among the highest-rated touring car series, several copies of the vehicle were launched in the WTCR and the TCR Europe Touring Car Series, the latter winning its first race, and in the TCR South America Touring Car Championship, several teams also bought them.

References

TCR cars
Cars introduced in 2020
Front-wheel-drive vehicles
Elantra N TCR